Alexander Tikhonov (born 1947) is a Russian biathlete.

Alexander Ivanovich Tikhonov may also refer to:

 Alexander Ivanovich Tikhonov (born 1938), Ukrainian pharmacist